Test of Submission is an album by the band Dysrhythmia. It is their first album with Profound Lore Records.

Track listing
 "In Secrecy" - 5:11
 "Test of Submission" - 4:54
 "The Line Always Snaps" - 6:06
 "Running Towards the End" - 5:41
 "In the Spirit of Catastrophe" - 7:02 
 "The Madness of Three" - 4:34
 "Like Chameleons" - 4:03
 "In Consequence" - 7:45

Personnel
 Kevin Hufnagel – guitar
 Colin Marston – bass
 Jeff Eber – drums

References

Dysrhythmia (band) albums